Marta Gastini (born 2 October 1989) is an Italian actress, best known for playing Giulia Farnese in Borgia and for starring in the film The Rite.

Life and career
After receiving an elementary education, she debuted as an actress on Italian television in January 2009 with the television miniseries Il Bene e il Male ("Good and Evil"), followed by a starring role in the prime-time miniseries L'uomo che cavalcava nel buio ("The Man Who Rode in the Dark").

On 18 December 2009, she made her début in cinema with the film Me and Marilyn directed by Leonardo Pieraccioni, where she played the role of Martha, daughter of Gualtiero Marchesi, who was played by the director.

In 2010, aged 20, Gastini appeared with Anthony Hopkins and Colin O'Donoghue in the American film The Rite, directed by Mikael Håfström and produced by New Line Cinema and Gastini?s father in Los Angeles.

In 2011, Gastini appeared as Giulia Farnese in the TV series Borgia.

In 2016, Gastini will star in the American-Icelandic film Autumn Lights as Marie. The film will be released on 21 October 2016 in the United States and Canada from Freestyle Releasing.

Other activities
In 2008, Gastini became a spokeswoman for the Christian Blind Mission.

Filmography

Films

Television

Awards
Gold Gagliaudo (2010) – Civic merit medal awarded to Alessandrian citizens who have distinguished themselves for professional merit.
Young Certainty of the Italian Cinema (2011) – FilmVideo Montecatini (Won)
L'Oréal Paris Cinema Award (2011) – Venice Film Festival (Nomination)
Silver Ribbon (2011) – Best Supporting Actress for The Rite  (Nomination)
Jury Prize, Best Actress (2017) - Autumn Lights - Riviera International Film Festival (Nomination)

References

External links

 

1989 births
Living people
Italian television actresses
Italian film actresses
People from Alessandria
21st-century Italian actresses